WGHC (1400 AM, Rabun County Radio 1400) was a radio station licensed to serve Clayton, Georgia, United States. The station was owned by Georgia-Carolina Radiocasting and the broadcast license was held by Tugart Properties, LLC.

WGHC broadcast a full-service news/talk radio format on weekday mornings and afternoons. Weekday evenings and on weekends, WGHC broadcasts an adult standards music format.

History
This station received its original construction permit for a new station broadcasting at 1400 kHz from the Federal Communications Commission on June 18, 2008. The new station was assigned the call sign WNGA by the FCC on July 22, 2008.

After the former WGHC at 1370 kHz moved to North Carolina and became WTCG, this station's call sign was changed to WGHC on May 26, 2009. WGHC received its license to cover from the FCC on June 9, 2009.

Tugart Properties surrendered the station's license to the FCC on April 17, 2014, as the station had been silent for more than a year due to the loss of its transmitter. The license was cancelled and the WGHC call sign deleted from the FCC database on May 1, 2014.

References

External links

GHC
Rabun County, Georgia
Radio stations established in 1946
1946 establishments in Georgia (U.S. state)
Defunct radio stations in the United States
Radio stations disestablished in 2014
2014 disestablishments in Georgia (U.S. state)
GHC